Facts on the ground is a diplomatic and geopolitical term that means the situation in reality as opposed to in the abstract.

The term was popularised in the 1970s in discussions of the Israeli–Palestinian conflict to refer to Israeli settlements built in the occupied West Bank, which were intended to establish permanent Israeli footholds in Palestinian territory.

Rashid Khalidi wrote in 2010:

See also

 Fait accompli
 De facto
 Status quo ante bellum
 Ex factis jus oritur
 Realpolitik
 Revanchism
 Operation Uvda
 Ground truth

References

Further reading
Gershom Gorenberg, The Accidental Empire: Israel and the Birth of the Settlements, 1967-1977, Macmillan, 2006

Political terminology
Political realism
Pragmatism
Metaphors referring to places
Territorial evolution
Geopolitical terminology
Treaties involving territorial changes

da:Ex factis jus oritur